Whatcom Pavilion is a 1,200 seat multi-purpose arena located in Bellingham, Washington, United States on the campus of Whatcom Community College. It is home to the Whatcom Community College Orcas and the Bellingham Slam of the International Basketball League, as well as the Bellingham Roller Betties roller derby league.

References

External links

 Whatcom Pavilion Official Site

Sports venues in Washington (state)
American Basketball Association (2000–present) venues
Basketball venues in Washington (state)
Buildings and structures in Bellingham, Washington
Tourist attractions in Bellingham, Washington